The Globalization and World Cities Research Network (GaWC) is a think tank that studies the relationships between world cities in the context of globalization. It is based in the geography department of Loughborough University in Leicestershire, United Kingdom. GaWC was founded by Peter J. Taylor in 1998.  Together with Jon Beaverstock and Richard G. Smith, they create the GaWC's biennial categorization of world cities into "Alpha", "Beta" and "Gamma" tiers, based upon their international connectedness.

GaWC city classification 
The GaWC examines cities worldwide to narrow them down to a roster of world cities, then ranks these based on their connectivity through four "advanced producer services": accountancy, advertising, banking/finance, and law. The GaWC inventory ranks city economics more heavily than political or cultural factors. Beyond the categories of "Alpha" world cities (with four sub-categories), "Beta" world cities (three sub-categories), and "Gamma" world cities (three sub-categories), the GaWC cities include additional cities at "High sufficiency" and "Sufficiency" level.

GaWC has published city classifications in 1998, 2000, 2004, 2008, 2010, 2012, 2016, 2018 and 2020. The 2004 rankings added several new indicators while continuing to rank city economics more heavily than political or cultural factors. The 2008 roster, similar to the 1998 version, is sorted into categories of Alpha world cities (with four sub-categories), Beta world cities (three sub-categories), Gamma world cities (three sub-categories), and additional cities with High sufficiency or Sufficiency presence. The list has been prone to change in the ranks. For example, some cities have been no longer classified as sufficient level that were selected prior 2018 like the United States cities, Greensboro and Providence.

2020 city classification 
The classification "results are derived from the activities of 175 leading firms providing advanced producer services across 707 cities worldwide (i.e. the input is 175 x 707 = 123,725 pieces of information). The results should be interpreted as indicating the importance of cities as nodes in the world city network (i.e. enabling corporate globalization)." The cities in the 2020 classification are as follows.

(1) or (1) indicates a city moved one category up or down since the 2018 classification.

Alpha 
Alpha level cities are linked to major economic states/regions and highly integrated into the world economy. Alpha level cities are classified into four sections: Alpha ++, Alpha +, Alpha, and Alpha − cities.

Alpha ++ 
Alpha ++ cities are cities most integrated with the global economy:

  London
  New York City

Alpha + 
Alpha + are "other highly integrated cities that complement London and New York, largely filling in advanced service needs for the Pacific/Asia":

  Beijing
  Dubai
  Hong Kong
  Paris
  Shanghai
  Singapore
  Tokyo

Alpha 

  Amsterdam (1)
  Brussels
  Chicago
  Frankfurt
  Jakarta
  Kuala Lumpur
  Los Angeles
  Madrid
  Mexico City
  Milan
  Moscow
  Mumbai
  São Paulo
  Sydney (1)
  Toronto

Alpha − 

  Bangkok (1)
  Bangalore (1)
  Boston (1)
  Buenos Aires (1)
  Dublin
  Guangzhou (1)
  Istanbul (1)
  Johannesburg
  Lisbon
  Luxembourg City
  Manila
  Melbourne (1)
  Montreal
  Munich
  New Delhi
  Prague
  Riyadh
  San Francisco
  Santiago
  Seoul (1)
  Shenzhen
  Stockholm
  Taipei (1)
  Vienna
  Warsaw (1)
  Zürich (1)

Beta 
Beta level cities are cities that link moderate economic regions to the world economy and are classified into three sections, Beta +, Beta, and Beta − cities.

Beta + 

  Atlanta
  Auckland
  Barcelona (1)
  Beirut  (1)
  Berlin (1)
  Bogotá (1)
  Brisbane (1)
  Bucharest
  Budapest (1)
  Cairo
  Chengdu
  Copenhagen
  Dallas
  Doha
  Düsseldorf
  Hamburg
  Houston (1)
  Lima
  Miami (2)
  Rome (1)
  Tel Aviv
  Vancouver
  Washington, D.C. (1)

Beta 

  Abu Dhabi
  Athens (1)
  Cape Town
  Casablanca
  Chennai
  Chongqing (1)
  Denver
  Hangzhou (1)
  Hanoi (1)
  Helsinki (1)
  Ho Chi Minh City (1)
  Karachi
  Kyiv
  Manama
  Montevideo
  Nairobi
  Nanjing
  Oslo
  Panama City (1)
  Perth (1)
  Philadelphia
  Rio de Janeiro
  Seattle (1)
  Tianjin

Beta − 

  Almaty
  Amman (2)
  Austin (2)
  Belgrade
  Bratislava
  Calgary (1)
  Caracas (1)
  Changsha
  Dalian
  Detroit (1)
  Dhaka
  Edinburgh
  Geneva
  George Town
  Guatemala City (1)
  Hyderabad (1)
  Jeddah
  Jinan
  Kampala
  Kuwait City (1)
  Lagos (1)
  Lahore (1)
  Lyon
  Manchester
  Minneapolis (1)
  Monterrey
  Muscat (1)
  Nicosia
  Osaka (1)
  Quito
  Saint Petersburg (2)
  San Diego (2)
  San José
  San Salvador
  Shenyang
  Sofia (1)
  Stuttgart
  Tampa (2)
  Tunis
  Wuhan (1)
  Xiamen
  Xi'an (1)
  Zagreb (1)
  Zhengzhou (1)

Gamma 
Gamma level cities are cities that link smaller economic regions into the world economy and are classified into three sections, Gamma +, Gamma, and Gamma − cities.

Gamma + 

  Adelaide
  Ahmedabad (1)
  Algiers (1)
  Antwerp (1)
  Baku (1)
  Baltimore (1)
  Belfast (1)
  Charlotte (1)
  Cologne (2)
  Dar es Salaam
  Glasgow
  Guadalajara (1)
  Hefei (1)
  Islamabad (1)
  Kolkata (1)
  Kunming (1)
  Ljubljana (1)
  Medellín (2)
  Orlando (2)
  Phnom Penh (2)
  Phoenix (1)
  Porto (1)
  Pune
  Qingdao (1)
  Riga
  Rotterdam
  San Jose (1)
  St. Louis (1)
  Suzhou (1)
  Tbilisi (1)

Gamma 

  Ankara
  Bristol
  Colombo (1)
  Dakar (2)
  Durban (1)
  Gothenburg (3)
  Guayaquil (1)
  Haikou (3)
  La Paz
  Malmö (3)
  Managua (2)
  Nantes (1)
  Nashville (1)
  Ottawa (1)
  San Juan (2)
  Santo Domingo
  Taichung (3)
  Tegucigalpa
  Tirana (1)
  Turin
  Valencia (2)
  Vilnius
  Wellington
  Wrocław (1)

Gamma − 

  Accra (2)
  Asunción (1)
  Belo Horizonte
  Bilbao (1)
  Cleveland (2)
  Columbus (2)
  Douala (1)
  Edmonton (1)
  Fuzhou
  Harare (2)
  Harbin (2)
  Kaohsiung (1)
  Kansas City (1)
  Katowice (2)
  Lausanne (1)
  Limassol (2)
  Luanda (1)
  Málaga (2)
  Maputo
  Milwaukee
  Nagoya (2)
  Nassau (1)
  Port Louis (3)
  Penang
  Poznań
  Querétaro (1)
  Sacramento
  Salt Lake City (2)
  Taiyuan (1)

Sufficiency 
Sufficiency level cities are cities that have a sufficient degree of services so as not to be overly dependent on world cities. This is sorted into High Sufficiency cities and Sufficiency cities.

High Sufficiency 

  Abidjan
  Abuja
  Birmingham (4)
  Brasília (1)
  Cincinnati (1)
  Curitiba (1)
  Dammam (1)
  Hartford
  Indianapolis (1)
  Johor Bahru (1)
  Kraków (1)
  Leeds
  Lusaka (2)
  Macau (1)
  Ningbo
  Porto Alegre
  Port of Spain (1)
  Puebla (1)
  Raleigh
  San Antonio (1)
  Seville (1)
  Strasbourg (1)
  The Hague (1)
  Tijuana (1)
  Ulaanbaatar (1)
  Yangon (1)
  Yerevan (1)

Sufficiency 

  Aarhus
  Aberdeen
  Aguascalientes City
  Alexandria
  Astana
  Baghdad
  Bandar Seri Begawan
  Barranquilla
  Basel
  Bergen
  Bern
  Birmingham
  Bishkek
  Blantyre
  Bologna
  Bordeaux
  Brazzaville
  Bremen
  Buffalo
  Bursa
  Busan
  Cali
  Campinas
  Canberra
  Cardiff
  Cebu City
  Changchun
  Chihuahua
  Chișinău
  Christchurch
  Ciudad Juárez
  Córdoba
  Des Moines
  Dortmund
  Dresden
  Dushanbe
  Essen
  Florence (1)
  Fukuoka
  Gaborone (1)
  Genoa
  Goiânia
  Graz
  Grenoble
  Guiyang
  Haifa
  Halifax
  Hamilton
  Hanover
  Harrisburg
  Hobart
  Hohhot
  Honolulu
  Hsinchu
  İzmir (1)
  Jacksonville
  Jerusalem
  Kabul
  Kazan
  Kigali
  Kingston
  Kinshasa
  Kobe
  Kochi
  Kyoto
  Labuan (1)
  Lanzhou
  Las Vegas (1)
  Leipzig
  León
  Libreville
  Liège
  Lille
  Linz
  Liverpool
  Łódź
  Lomé
  Louisville
  Malacca
  Mannheim
  Marseille
  Memphis
  Mérida
  Mexicali
  Minsk (2)
  Montpellier
  Nanchang
  Nanning
  Naples
  New Orleans
  Newcastle upon Tyne
  Nice
  Nottingham
  Novosibirsk
  Nuremberg
  Oklahoma City
  Omaha
  Palermo
  Palo Alto
  Pittsburgh
  Podgorica
  Port Elizabeth
  Port Harcourt
  Portland
  Port Moresby
  Pretoria
  Quebec City
  Recife
  Reykjavík
  Richmond
  Rochester
  Rosario
  Salvador
  San Luis Potosí City
  San Pedro Sula
  Sanaa
  Santa Cruz de la Sierra
  Sapporo
  Sarajevo
  Saskatoon
  Sendai
  Sheffield
  Shijiazhuang
  Skopje (1)
  Southampton (1)
  Surabaya (1)
  Suva
  Tainan
  Tallinn (3)
  Tashkent
  Toulouse
  Trieste
  Tulsa
  Ürümqi
  Utrecht
  Valencia
  Valparaíso
  Vientiane
  Windhoek
  Winnipeg
  Wuxi
  Yokohama
  Zhuhai

No longer classified 
The following cities were included in the 2018 edition, but not in the 2020 edition:

  Antananarivo
  Kathmandu
  Leicester
  Madison
  Nantong
  Weifang
  Xining

See also 
 Global city

Notes

References

External links 
 GaWC official website

Research institutes in Leicestershire
Social science institutes
Think tanks established in 1998
1998 establishments in England
Loughborough University
Global studies research